A cruller is a deep-fried pastry like a doughnut popular in Europe and North America often made from a rectangle of dough with a cut made in the middle that allows it to be pulled over and through itself, producing twists in the sides of the pastry. The cruller has been described as resembling "a small, braided torpedo". Some other cruller styles are made of a denser dough somewhat like that of a cake doughnut formed in a small loaf or stick shape, but not always twisted. Crullers may be topped with powdered sugar (sometimes mixed with cinnamon) or icing.

A French cruller is a fluted, ring-shaped doughnut made from choux pastry with a light airy texture. The German Spritzkuchen is very similar, while the Dutch and Belgian sprits is baked instead of being fried.

History 
The name cruller comes from the early 19th-century Dutch , from  'to curl'. They are traditionally baked on New Year's Eve as a family project, with the kids doing the labor-intensive shaping and the grown-ups handling the deep fat frying. In Danish they are known as klejner and in Swedish as klenäter, both names deriving from Low German. In Scandinavia, these types of crullers are common at Christmas. In the US, various shapes of pastries are known as "crullers". Some forms of those crullers are what is traditionally eaten in Germany and some other European countries on Shrove Tuesday, to use up fat before Lent.

The term "Chinese cruller" is occasionally applied to the youtiao, a similar-looking fried dough food eaten in East and Southeast Asia. The term cruller is also associated with the mahua. Mahua is a type of twisted fried dough much denser and sweeter than youtiao.

The "Aberdeen crulla" is a traditional Scottish pastry made in the same way as the rectangular, plaited cruller of New England. It is first attested in Edinburgh in 1829 and is thought to copied from the 'cruller' of the United States according to the Scottish National Dictionary (1931–1976). Distinct from this, the "yum-yum" is a commonly available treat in Scotland, which resembles a straightened French cruller coated in thin glacé icing.

In 1909, a US author published her belief that crullers were invented in the New World in 1617 by Sebastian Croll; according to her, this was due to the perceived similarity of the names.

Spritzkuchen
In Germany, Spritzkuchen are said to have originated in Eberswalde as part of carnival celebrations that take place before Lent. In past times supplies of animal fats had to be used up before Lent so they would not spoil and go to waste and Spritzkuchen was one of the dishes created to meet this need.

Availability
Crullers are most commonly found in Canada, New England, the Mid-Atlantic and North Central states of the United States, but are also common in California. The German origin is probably why traditional crullers can be found more easily in the Midwest, where many German immigrants settled. Some family-owned bakeries still call them "krullers."

In 2003, the Dunkin' Donuts chain of doughnut shops stopped carrying traditional crullers, claiming that the hand-shaped rectangular treats were too labor-intensive, and couldn't be simulated with new machines for mixing doughnut batter. The company still sells "French crullers" which can be formed by a kind of extruding nozzle.

Tim Hortons, and Honey Dew Donuts still sell the Cruller doughnut. Krispy Kreme sell a similar doughnut the company refers to as a cruller, but in reality it is just a molded/formed cake (or Old Fashioned) doughnut. In place of the traditional cruller, Dunkin' Donuts now sells several variations of a substitute product it calls a "cake stick" which is a simplified, machine-made rectangular version of the elaborately twisted, hand-made variety.  In the southeastern U.S., French crullers are a fresh-baked everyday bakery item at Publix grocery stores.

In 1973, the French cruller became available in Mister Donut stores in Japan.

See also

List of doughnut varieties
List of German desserts

 Angel wings, another twisted deep-fried dough
 Berliner (pastry), another doughnut popular in Germany
 Churros, a fried choux pastry originating in Spain and Portugal
 Fasnacht (pastry), another Shrove Tuesday related doughnut
 Fritter, another donut-like pastry
 King cake
 Koeksister, a twisted doughnut popular in South Africa
 Long John (doughnut), the common American rectangular doughnut, made from a yeast dough
 Maejap-gwa, a ribbon-shaped Korean pastry 
 Oliebol, the basic Dutch doughnut
 Twisted doughnut

References

External links
 

Carnival foods
American doughnuts
German-American cuisine
Canadian doughnuts
German pastries